Schwasdorf is a municipality  in the Rostock district, in Mecklenburg-Vorpommern, Germany.

References